Aberdeen Bach Choir is a choir with members from Aberdeen, Scotland. Membership is open to anyone, aged 15 or over, who is able to fulfil the Choir's reason for existence, i.e. to perform Choral works. All members must be able to sing accurately and in tune, with a secure sense of rhythm.

About
Founded with the influence of the distinguished Bach scholar Charles Sanford Terry (historian) and direction of Warren T Clemens in 1913 as the Aberdeen Bach Society, it was reconstituted as Aberdeen Bach Choir in 1956.  With an initial 12 members it has grown to now having between 90 and 100.

Aberdeen Bach Choir (Scottish Registered Charity SC008609), based in the city of Aberdeen, Scotland performs the music not only of Johann Sebastian Bach (1685–1750), but also a wide variety of choral music from the 17th to the 21st Century.

The choir currently performs two main recitals a year in St Machar's Cathedral in Old Aberdeen.  It has also performed in recent years at Brechin Arts Festival, Greyfriars Kirk in Edinburgh and in London.

Aberdeen Bach Choir is affiliated to Making Music Scotland.

Conductors
Willian Swainson        1956–1957

John B. Dalby           1957–1960

Graham R. Wiseman       1960–1967

David Murray            1967–1969

James G. Lobban         1969–2006

Gordon Jack             2006–2010

Peter Parfitt      2010-2022

Paul Tierney   2022 -

Concerts
Concerts are usually held on Sunday evening in St Machar's Cathedral. They are often accompanied by the Aberdeen Sinfonetta orchestra and professional soloists are brought in for the main concerts.

The Chronicle of St Machar
In January 1998, an application for funding from the National Lottery to commission a new work was accepted.  The Chronicle of Saint Machar, a piece for orchestra and two choirs, which was based on the life of St. Machar, was composed by the renowned Scottish composer, John McLeod (composer).

The piece is an evocative work which combines adult and children choirs, along with orchestra and a range of percussion which includes bells and a Saab car spring.

The first performance took place in the cathedral bearing the saint's name, St Machar's Cathedral, Aberdeen on 25 April 1999, (reviewed by James Allan; The Scotsman; 26 April 1999), followed by a second performance at the same venue on 6 June 1999.  With further 'Awards for All' funding from the Scottish Arts Council lottery fund, a third performance took place on 28 October 2000 at Greyfriars Kirk, Edinburgh (reviewed by Conrad Wilson; The Herald (Glasgow); 10/2000).

To celebrate the 250th anniversary of the birth of Robert Burns and Homecoming Scotland 2009, a fourth performance took place on 6 December 2009 in St Machar's Cathedral, along with the first performance of another specially commissioned work, funded from the James Lobban Bequest, Love is like the Melody by the Scottish composer Ken Johnston.

References

External links
 Aberdeen Bach Choir website
 St Machar website
 Making Music Scotland (Aberdeen Page)
 Aberdeen Sinfonietta website
 John McLeod
 Ken Johnston

Scottish choirs
Bach choirs
Musical groups established in 1913
1913 establishments in Scotland